Pierfrancesco de' Medici the Elder (1430 – 19 July 1476) was an Italian nobleman, banker, diplomat, and a member of the House of Medici of Florence.

Biography
Born in Florence, he was the son of Lorenzo the Elder and Ginevra Cavalcanti, thus a nephew of Cosimo de' Medici and cousin to Piero the Gouty, de facto lords of the city from 1459.

Pierfrancesco was orphaned in 1440 and was raised by his uncle Cosimo. He served the Republic of Florence as ambassador (to the pope in 1458 and to the Duchy of Mantua in 1463) and as Priore delle Arti ("Prior of the Guilds") in the Florentine municipal government (1459). After Cosimo's death (1464), Pierfrancesco was initially a supporter of Piero the Gouty, but later sided against him; he was among the conspirators who participated in Luca Pitti's failed coup in 1466. Forgiven by Piero, he thenceforth took care of the family bank.

From his marriage with Laudomia di Agnolo Acciaioli he had two sons: Lorenzo (1463–1503) and Giovanni (1467–1498), who were later fierce opponents of Cosimo's line of the Medici.

Pierfrancesco died in 1476. His sons were adopted by their second cousin Lorenzo il Magnifico.

1430 births
1476 deaths
Pierfrancesco 1
Italian bankers
15th-century people of the Republic of Florence
Medieval Italian diplomats
Medieval bankers
Ambassadors of the Republic of Florence
15th-century diplomats
15th-century Italian businesspeople